Isoka District is a district of Zambia, located in Muchinga Province. The capital lies at Isoka. As of the 2000 Zambian Census, the district had a population of 99,319 people.

References

Districts of Muchinga Province